Death Car on the Freeway is a 1979 American made-for-television crime thriller film starring Shelley Hack. In a plot similar to Steven Spielberg's Duel, this tells the story of an unseen driver who is dubbed "The Freeway Fiddler".

The cast features several TV veterans, including George Hamilton, Frank Gorshin, Peter Graves, Dinah Shore, Harriet Nelson, Barbara Rush and Abe Vigoda. Director Hal Needham appears in a supporting role. The face of the driver is never shown, and none of the stunt drivers who "acted him out" are credited for the role of "The Freeway Fiddler". Death Car on the Freeway first aired on CBS television on September 25, 1979 (presented as the CBS Tuesday Night Movie).

Plot
Janette Clausen (Hack) is a television reporter investigating a series of freeway murders involving a psychopathic van driver who is deliberately targeting and killing female motorists by crashing into their cars. She pieces together clues while continuously facing opposition from those around her.

Cast
Shelley Hack – Jan Claussen 
Peter Graves – Lieutenant Haller 
Frank Gorshin – Ralph Chandler 
George Hamilton – Ray Jeffries 
Harriet Nelson – Mrs. Sheel
Barbara Rush – Rosemary 
Dinah Shore – Lynn Bernheimer 
Abe Vigoda – Mr. Frisch 
Alfie Wise – Ace Durham 
Robert F. Lyons – Barry Hill 
Tara Buckman – Jane Guston 
Morgan Brittany – Becky Lyons 
Nancy Stephens – Christine 
Hal Needham – Mr. Blanchard

External links

1979 television films
1979 films
1970s crime thriller films
American crime thriller films
CBS network films
Films directed by Hal Needham
American serial killer films
Films scored by Richard Markowitz
Films about automobiles
Films about journalists
Films set in Los Angeles
1970s English-language films
1970s American films